Anthony John Hungle (c. 1926 – May 27, 1997) was a Canadian football player who played for the Saskatchewan Roughriders. He played junior football in Regina.

References

1920s births
Saskatchewan Roughriders players
1997 deaths